2d Landing Support Battalion (2d LSB) is a logistics battalion in the United States Marine Corps that supports distributed maritime operations and expeditionary advanced base operations. The unit is based out of Marine Corps Base Camp Lejeune, North Carolina and falls under the command of the 2nd Marine Logistics Group (2d MLG) and the II Marine Expeditionary Force (II MEF).

Mission
Provide throughput support for II Marine Expeditionary Force and other Marine Air-Ground Task Force operations in order to enable the distribution of equipment, personnel, and supplies by air, ground, and sea.

Table of organization
 Headquarters and Service Company.
 Landing Support Company
 Beach and Terminal Operations Company
 Landing Support Equipment Company

History
The battalion was originally commissioned during World War II as Shore Party Detachment, 2nd Marine Division on November 17, 1941.

Unit awards
A unit citation or commendation is an award bestowed upon an organization for the action cited. Members of the unit who participated in said actions are allowed to wear on their uniforms the awarded unit citation. Awards and decorations of the United States Armed Forces have different categories: i.e. Service, Campaign, Unit, and Valor.  2d LSB has been presented with the following awards:

See also
 List of United States Marine Corps battalions
 Organization of the United States Marine Corps

References

External links
 

2dLSB